Indien, often L'Indien, was a frigate built for the U.S. Commissioners in France – Benjamin Franklin, Silas Deane, and Arthur Lee – to a design by the French naval architect Jacques Boux. She was laid down early in 1777 by a private shipyard in Amsterdam and launched in February 1778. Apparently she was built with the scantlings and lines of a small 74-gun Third Rate ship of the line but was a frigate in construction. In 1780 the Duke of Luxembourg chartered her to the navy of South Carolina and she sailed as South Carolina.

Construction history

In 1777, Continental Navy officer John Paul Jones sailed for the Kingdom of France, hoping to assume command of Indien; however, prior to his arrival, financial difficulties and opposition from the still-neutral Dutch Republic, under pressure from the Kingdom of Great Britain, had forced the commissioners to sell the frigate to King Louis XVI.

For over three years the ship remained idle while several American and European agents schemed to obtain her. Finally, on 30 May 1780 the King granted her to the Duke of Luxembourg, who simultaneously chartered her to South Carolina, represented by Commodore Alexander Gillon of the South Carolina Navy, for a quarter-share of her prizes. Gillon renamed the frigate South Carolina.

Service as South Carolina and capture

In 1781 South Carolina, manned by American officers and a group of European seamen and marines, sailed from Texel via Scotland and Ireland. On the way she captured a privateer. She then stopped at Corunna and Santa Cruz before sailing across the Atlantic toward Charleston. On the way to Tenerife she captured the brig Venus, loaded with a cargo of salt fish from Newfoundland for Lisbon. When she found that the British had already occupied Charleston she sailed for the West Indies. On the way she captured five Jamaican vessels in the Gulf of Mexico. She then took her prizes to Havana, Cuba.

South Carolina arrived at Havana on 12 January 1782. At Havana, after negotiations between Gillon and the Spanish, the South Carolina joined a force of 59 vessels sent to capture the British colony of New Providence in the Bahamas. On 22 April the expedition sailed and by 5 May the whole fleet had reached New Providence. On 8 May the colony surrendered. This was the third capture of New Providence during the American Revolutionary War.

South Carolina then sailed north, arriving at Philadelphia on 28 May. On the way, on 25 May a British privateer, the Virginia of New York, trailed her, firing the occasional cannon to try to draw the attention of any vessels of the Royal Navy that might be cruising in the area. South Carolina sustained no damage.

She remained in Philadelphia nearly six months. While she was there the Duke of Luxembourg dismissed Gillon and replaced him as captain with Captain John Joyner. She sailed in November but not very far. Most of her crew had never been out to sea and began to have regrets. Fortunately she had some 50 Hessian marines and eight British soldiers aboard who had been captured from General John Burgoyne's army at the Battle of Saratoga and who had been recruited from prison. Ironically, they remained loyal, thus forestalling the brewing mutiny.

On 20 December, while she was attempting to dash out of Philadelphia, Pennsylvania, through the British blockade she ran into a squadron of three British frigates. South Carolina was in the company of the brig Constance, schooner Seagrove and the ship Hope, which had joined her for protection.

The British chased South Carolina for 18 hours and fired on her for two hours before she struck her colours in the Delaware River. She had a crew of about 466 men when captured, of whom she lost six men killed and eight wounded. The British suffered no casualties.

Astraea and Quebec captured Hope and Constance, which was carrying tobacco. Prize crews then took South Carolina, Hope and Constance to New York. Seagrove escaped.

The British did not take South Carolina into service because she was too lightly framed for the Royal Navy. The problem was that South Carolinas hull had hogged as a consequence of the weight of her guns. (American warship designers subsequently put much more longitudinal strength into the design of their frigates.)

Fate
The British put South Carolina up for sale to private parties for use as a merchantman. Her last recorded trip was to Deal, Kent in 1783 as part of the British evacuation of New York. She carried some 600 German soldiers, some of whom may well earlier have served on her as marines. There is no information about what happened to South Carolina thereafter though the discovery during World War II of a ship's bell with the name South Carolina on it in a jute mill between Calcutta and the coast on the Ganges River in India suggests that she may have reached the Indian Ocean.

Notes

Citations

References

 Allen, Joseph (1853) Battles of the British navy. (London: H.G. Bohn).
 Coker, P. C., III. (1987) Charleston's Maritime Heritage, 1670–1865: An Illustrated History. (Charleston, S.C.: Coker-Craft). 
 Cooper, James Fennimore (1847) History of the Navy of the United States. (Cooperstown: H. & E. Phinney).
 Silverstone, Paul H. (2006) The Sailing Navy, 1775–1854 . (Routledge). 
 Lewis, Lewis A. (1999) Neptune's Militia: The Frigate "South Carolina" during the American Revolution. (Kent, Ohio: Kent State University). 
 Volo, James M. (2007) Blue water patriots : the American Revolution afloat. (Westport, Conn.: Praeger). 
 Chapelle, Howard I. (1949) "The History of The American Sailing Navy". (New York, NY.:W.W. Norton & Co. Inc.)   

Ships built in Amsterdam
1778 ships
Frigates of the French Navy
Age of Sail frigates of France
American Revolutionary War ships of the United States
Ships of the Continental Navy